The University of Kikwit (UNIKI) is a public university in the Democratic Republic of the Congo, located in the province of Bandundu, city of Kikwit. At its creation, it was an Extension of the University of Kinshasa, then called University Centre of Kikwit (CUK). As of 2012, instruction is in French.

History
The University was created as Kikwit Center University (CUK), an extension of the University of Lubumbashi, and became autonomous in 2010 following Ministerial order No. 157/MINESU/CABMIN/EBK/PK/2010 27 September 2010.

References
 Ministerial Decree No. 157/MINESU/CABMIN/EBK-PK-2010 September 27, 2010, on the empowerment of some extensions of the institutions of higher and university education (article 2 point 8)

See also
 Kikwit
 Bandundu

Universities in the Democratic Republic of the Congo
Kikwit
2010 establishments in the Democratic Republic of the Congo